Sainte-Montaine is a commune in the Cher department in the Centre-Val de Loire region of France.

Geography
The small river Boute-Vive rises in the commune.

Population

Personalities
Marguerite Audoux (1863- 1937), French novelist, lived here in her youth.

Sights
 The church, dating from the fifteenth century.
 The feudal motte.
 The chapel of Belle Fontaine.

See also
Communes of the Cher department

References

Communes of Cher (department)